The Journal of Marine Research is an American journal, first published by Yale University in 1937, that covers peer-reviewed scientific articles and is still published today. The academic journal publishes articles that deal with biological processes, as well as those that report significant observations. A supplement, The Sea is occasionally published.

References

External links
Peabody.yale.edu
Peabody.yale.edu

Further reading
 Sears Foundation Journal of Marine Research, 1937-1938, Vol. 1, Issues 1-4.

Yale University academic journals
Biology journals